Katikati College is a co-educational Year 7 to 13 school.

Principals 
 1935: Mr S. M. Kemp
 1966–1976: Mr R. Greaves
 1977–1981: Mr Lind
 1982–1999: Mr B Blackstock
 2000–2009: Mr P Leggat
 2010–2017: Mr N Harray
 2017–2021: Mrs Carolyn Pentecost
 2021: Mrs Louise Buckley (Acting)

Houses 
Katikati College has four houses. The houses are all named after prominent Katikati families. They are:
 Mulgan (red) Named after William Edward Mulgan
 Stewart (blue) Named after George Vesey Stewart
 Macmillan (green) Named after Donald Theodore Macmillan
 Gledstanes (purple) Named after Edward Gledstanes

Notable alumni 
 Mabel Wharekawa-Burt, television and film actress
 Toby Hendy, science communicator and YouTuber

References

External links
 Katikati College

Secondary schools in the Bay of Plenty Region
Western Bay of Plenty District